JD Moller (born 22 October 1982 in Carnavon) is a South African rugby union footballer.

External links 
Stormers profile

1982 births
Living people
South African rugby union players
Rugby union props
Afrikaner people
Stormers players
Western Province (rugby union) players
Stellenbosch University alumni
Alumni of Paarl Boys' High School
Rugby union players from the Northern Cape